Jacob Vargas (born August 18, 1971) is a Mexican-American actor and performer.

Early life
Vargas was born in Michoacán, Mexico, and raised in Pacoima, Los Angeles, California. He was raised in a devout Roman Catholic family. He attended high school at San Fernando High School in San Fernando, California.

Career
Vargas has been a working actor for over thirty years.

In 1992, Vargas appeared in American Me. In 1995, Vargas won the very first ALMA Award (for Emerging Artist of the Year) for his work in both Allison Anders' Mi Vida Loca, and Gregory Nava's My Family. In 1995, Vargas would appear in Get Shorty. In 1997, Vargas appeared in Romy and Michele's High School Reunion. In 1999, Vargas became the voice of Max Steel.

In 2000, Vargas played Benicio del Toro's partner Manolo in director Steven Soderbergh's drug trafficking pic Traffic, which earned him a Screen Actors Guild Award and another ALMA Award. The same year he also played the Joker from the Joker Brothers in the Next Friday. He played A.B. Quintanilla, the brother of the late Tejano singer Selena in the biopic film of the same name. In 2002, Vargas would play Caesar Chavez in FX Network's film RFK. In 2004, Vargas played Sammy the chef in John Moore's Flight of the Phoenix.

In 2005, Vargas co-starred with Paul Walker and Laurence Fishburne in The Death and Life of Bobby Z. and also played Marine sniper Cortez in Sam Mendes' war drama Jarhead. In 2006, Vargas played a politically charged busboy in Emilio Estevez's historical drama Bobby. In 2011, Vargas played the father of Water Enrique Murciano and Power Nicholas Gonzalez in this true story.

From 2013 to 2014, Vargas played Montez on two seasons of Sons of Anarchy and six episodes of Mayans M.C.

In 2014, Vargas played Richard Chavez opposite Michael Peña in the biopic Cesar Chavez directed by Diego Luna.

In 2015, Vargas played Edison "Elvis" Peña in the film The 33, It is the true story of the 33 Chilean miners that were trapped for 69 days.

In 2016, Vargas reoccurred as Domingo Colon in the Netflix series Luke Cage. In 2016, Vargas also reoccurred in Colony, Amazon Studio's Hand of God  and he co-stars in Hulu's Crushed. In 2019, Vargas co-starred in Max Carlson's Princess of the Row opposite Martin Sheen and Ana Ortiz. He also co-starred in Peel.

From 2019 to 2020, Vargas was a regular on the Netflix series Mr. Iglesias.

In 2020, Jacob Vargas and Justina Machado were Masters of Ceremonies at the National Hispanic Media Coalition Impact Awards.

Personal life
He is married to Sylvia Arzate. They have two daughters, Rosa, born in 2004 and Victoria, born in 2011. Vargas has four brothers and one sister.

Filmography

Film

Television

Audio books

References

External links

1971 births
American male film actors
Film producers from California
American male soap opera actors
American male television actors
American male voice actors
Hispanic and Latino American male actors
20th-century American male actors
21st-century American male actors
Outstanding Performance by a Cast in a Motion Picture Screen Actors Guild Award winners
People from Pacoima, Los Angeles
Living people
Mexican emigrants to the United States
Male actors from Michoacán
American male actors of Mexican descent